Kafr Naseh is a town in northern Aleppo Governorate, northwestern Syria. Administratively part of Nahiya Tell Rifaat in A'zaz District, the village has a population of 1,433 as per the 2004 census. Nearby localities include Tell Rifaat to the north, Kafr Naya to the west, Maskan and Ahras to the south, and Herbel to the east.

References

Populated places in Azaz District
Towns in Aleppo Governorate